Ponniyin Selvan is a historical fiction novel by Indian author Kalki Krishnamurthy, written in Tamil. It was first serialized in the weekly editions of Kalki, a Tamil magazine, from 29 October 1950 to 16 May 1954 and later integrated into five volumes in 1955. In about 2,210 pages, it tells the story of early days of Chola prince Arulmozhivarman. Kalki visited Sri Lanka three times to gather information and for inspiration.

Ponniyin Selvan is regarded as one of the greatest novels of Tamil literature. The fan-following for the series, which was published weekly in Kalki, was such that it elevated the magazine circulation to reach a figure of 71,366 copies –a vast readership in a newly independent India. The book continued to be admired in the modern era, developing a cult following and fanbase among people of all generations. Ponniyin Selvan has garnered critical acclaim for its tightly woven plot, vivid narration, wit of the dialogue, and portrayal of the intrigues and power struggle of the Chola empire in the 10th-century.

A film adaptation of the novel, directed by Indian filmmaker Mani Ratnam, is underway. The first part, Ponniyin Selvan: I (PS1), was released on 30 September 2022. The second part, Ponniyin Selvan: II (PS2), is set to be released on 28 April 2023.

Book volumes

Overview

Characters 

 Vallavaraiyan Vandiyathevan: The brave, adventurous and sarcastic warrior prince of the Vaanar clan, who later becomes the Commander for Southern Troops under the reign of Utthama Chola. He is the bodyguard and close friend of Karikalan,who sends him as a messenger to Sundara Chola in Thanjavur to invite him to the newly built golden palace in Kanchi. His impulsive actions put himself and others in danger but he comes out of them with trickery and luck. He is the lover of Princess Kundavai. He is loved one-sidedly by Manimekalai, the sister of Kandanmaran. 
 Nandhini: Pazhuvoor Princess and wife of Periya Pazhuvettaraiyar whose birth and origin was doubtful in the beginning. The main antagonist of the story. She was born in Madurai and grew up in a priest family along with royal children in Pazhayarai until her youth. She is the foster-sister of Azhwarkadiyan Nambi. She hated Kundavai as Kundavai was jealous of Nandhini's beauty. Nandhini and Prince Aditya Karikalan developed a liking for each other in their childhood which nobody in the royalty liked. She was forced to flee Pazhaiyarai and live in Madurai. After Aditya Karikalan beheaded the injured Veerapandiyan, Nandhini joined Pandya conspirators and vowed to avenge Veerapandiyan's death by killing Karikalan and destroying the Chola dynasty. By marrying Periya Pazhuvettaraiyar who had lusted for her and by using him, she helped the Pandya conspirators. She married Aditha to involve him. She had a deep hatred towards the Chola royals for their ill-treatment and also had a desire for the throne. She had a terrible childhood that affected her badly and wanted to be with her mother Mandakini. Parthibendra Pallava and Kandanmaran fell for her beauty and she used them for her plot too. [Mandakini Devi went to Thanjavur (while she was pregnant), Sembiyan Maadevi was pregnant too, so she took care of Mandakini during her pregnancy. During child birth Sembiyan Maadevi gave birth to a still born son but Mandakini gave birth to twins - a boy (Madhurantaka) and a girl (Nandhini). Sembiyan Maadevi swapped her still born son with Mandakini's son. She asked Vaani Ammal (a maid in the place at that time) to bury her still born son and gave the daughter to Azhwarkadiyan's parents. After leaving the palace, Vaani Ammal notices that Sembiyan Maadevi's son (Senthan Amuthan) is alive. She fosters him and raises him as her own son.
 Azhwarkadiyan Nambi (alias Thirumalaiappan): A Veera Vaishnavite spy who works for the Prime Minister Aniruddha Brahmarayar and Queen Mother Sembiyan Mahadevi. He is the foster-brother of Nandhini and also a close friend of Vandiyathevan. He works closely with Vandiyathevan and saves him from many dangers. He was a loyal, trustful servant to the Chola royal government. He often engages in verbal battles with Veera Shaivites and Advaitis.
 Periya Pazhuvettaraiyar: The chancellor and treasurer of the Chola kingdom from the Pazhuvettaraiyar clan who was respected for his valor, as demonstrated by his 64 battle scars. The second most powerful man in the empire. Enamoured by her beauty, he marries a much younger Nandini, and gets scapegoated by her. He was the leader of the conspirators who tried to make Madhurantakan the next emperor.
 Ilaya Piraatti Kundhavai Devi: The Chola princess. Second child and only daughter of Sundara Chola. Lover of Vandiyathevan. She was respected much by her father and the people for her intelligence and wit. Unlike other princesses of those times, she had ambitions of expanding the Chola empire and enhancing its glory and took a vow to never leave her motherland. She used her brother Arulmozhivarman and his son to achieve her ambition. She raised and taught Arulmozhivarman to be an intelligent prince and wished to make him the Chola emperor. She sent Vandiyathevan to bring back Arulmozhivarman from Sri Lanka to guard him.
Vaanathi: The shy but playful princess of Kodumbalur. She was raised by her uncle Periya Velar Boothi Vikramakesari because both her father, Siriya Velar and mother are killed. She was sent to Pazhayarai to be one of Kundavai Devi's many friends/ helpers. She tends to faint in stressful situations due to which Ilaya Piratti takes special care of her, making the other princesses envious. She receives a prophecy from Kudanthai Jothidar stating she will bear an extraordinary warrior son who will conquer all 7 seas. She has an immense devotion for Ponniyin Selvan and wishes to marry him. Poonguzhali says that she wished to be the queen by marrying Ponniyin selvan, for which Vaanathi took a oath that even though she marries ponniyin selvan she will not assend the throne as queen but she will be the wife of ponniyin selvan.
 Arulmozhivarman/ Ponniyin Selvan later known as Rajaraja I: The titular protagonist. The youngest son of Sundara Chola. He was raised in Pazhayarai by Periya Piratti and Ilaya Piratti. He was taught well by his sister and was sent to Sri Lanka at the age of 19 for battle. He was said to be saved by Mother Kaveri herself from drowning in the river when he was 5, earning him the title "Ponniyin Selvan" ("Son of Kaveri").
 Aditya Karikalan: Eldest son of Sundara Chola, the crown prince and the commander of Northern troops during Sundara Chola's reign. He was a distinguished warrior who began fighting at the age of 12. He was known all over the empire for his valiant acts. His haste and irascibility alienated many, and resulted in a conspiracy against him.
 Poonguzhali: A boat woman, she was born and raised in Kodaikkarai. She was adventurous and fearless. She deeply distrusted and disliked men and civilization. She holds great affection for her aunt Mandakini Devi. She also has an intense love for Ponniyin Selvan and yearns to be Queen because she believes her Aunt should have been the rightful Queen. She saves Arulmozhivarman when he drowns in the ocean and secretly takes him to Nagapattinam to recuperate. She was named "Samudrakumari" (The Maiden of the Ocean) by Prince Arulmozhivarman himself. She marries Senthan Amuthan/ Madhuranthakan and attains her desire of being Queen.
 Madhurantaka Uttama Chozhan alias Senthan Amudhan: He is the son of Sembian Madevi who was given to the flower seller Vaani Ammal, assuming to be a still born baby. . He is a close friend of Vandiyathevan, and helped the latter many times in his missions when he was still known as the son of Vaani Ammal and a calm, humble and honest Shaivite devotee.
 Vaani Ammai: The deaf and mute foster mother of Senthan Amuthan, sister of Mandakini and Thiyaaga Vidankar. Aunt of Poonguzhali. She was skilled in traditional medicine remedies.
 Chinna Pazhuvettaraiyar: alias Kaalandhakandar: The chief in-charge of Thanjavur fort. Younger brother of Periya Pazhuvettaraiyar to whom he had huge respect and love. He is the father-in-law of Mathuranthakar. Both Pazhuvettaraiyar brothers hated Vandiyathevan at first. Chinna Pazhuvettaraiyar constantly warns his brother about Nandini and her conspiracy, but his cautionary words fall on deaf ears.
 Sundara Chola alias Parantaka II: The emperor of Chola empire. He was known for his facial beauty which gave him his name 'Sundara'. When his legs became paralyzed and his health began rapidly deteriorating, the Pazhuvettaraiyar brothers moved the emperor from Pazhayarai to Thanjavur so they could better protect him. This sparked the debate for the next rightful heir. His wish was to appoint his uncle's son as his successor. There was a widespread rumor that the emperor was kept as a prisoner by the Pazhuvettaraiyar brothers.
 Vanavan Madevi alias Idaya Pirattiyar: Empress of the Chola empire. Chief queen, wife and caretaker of Sundara Chola. Mother of all his children. Daughter of Thirukovalur Malaiyamaan.
 Sembiyan Madevi alias Periya Pirattiyar: Wife of Gandaraditya Chola and mother of Utthama Chola. A Shaivite devotee who donates a lot of resources to build temples for Lord Shiva across the Chola empire. She was steadfast in not making her son the emperor, which was also the dying wish of her husband. [Mandakini Devi went to Thanjavur (while she was pregnant), Sembiyan Maadevi was pregnant too, so she took care of Mandakini during her pregnancy. During child birth Sembiyan Maadevi gave birth to a still born son but Mandakini gave birth to twins – a boy (Madhurantaka) and a girl (Nandhini). Sembiyan Maadevi swapped her still born son with Mandakini's son. She asked Vaani Ammal (she was a maid in the place at that time) to bury her still born son and gave the daughter to Azhwarkadiyan's parents. Vaani Ammal after leaving the palace notices that Sembiyan Maadevi's son (Senthan Amuthan) is alive, she fosters him and raises him as her own son.]
 Pinaagapani: Son of the traditional healer in Pazhayarai. He was narrow-minded and ambitious and always considered Vandiyathevan his enemy but gets beaten by him all throughout the story. Pinaagapani was sent by Kundavai with Vandiyathevan to lead the way from Pazhaiyarai to Kodikkarai where the former lusts over Poonkuzhali but fails to attract her. His desire to gain high positions in the empire make him prey to Nandini's plans. Killed by Kandhanmaaran
 Thirukovalur Malaiyaman alias Milaadudaiyar: Father-in-law of Sundara Chola and maternal grandfather to his children. He was a well-wisher and advisor for Karikalan and lived with him in Kanchi. He was a rival of the Kadamboor ruler.
 Parthibendra Pallavan: Friend of Karikalan, who comes from the lineage of Pallavas. He fought along with him in battles. He lusts Nandhini and hates Vandiyathevan from the beginning.
 Thiyaaga Vidankar: Father of Poonguzhali and in-charge of the light house at Kodikkarai. He is the younger brother of Mandakini Devi and Vaani Ammal.
 Rakkammaal: Sister-in-law of Poonguzhali. She joined the Pandiyan conspirators due to her greed for money. Revadasa Kiramavithan was her father.
 Anbil Aniruddha Brahmarayar: The Prime Minister of emperor Sundara Chola's Court and a close friend and confidante to the emperor. He was highly respected by the people for his wit and intelligence. On Sundara Chola's request, he became the minister and assisted Sundara Chola in matters of administration in addition to being a teacher. He was the keeper of many of the emperor's personal and royal secrets. His network of spies across the Chola empire ensured that almost nothing could happen without his knowledge. One of the best of them is Azhwarkadiyan Nambi.
 Boothi Vikramakesari alias Kodumbalur Periya Velar: Irunkovel chieftain and uncle of Vaanathi. The Commander of the southern troops during Sundara Chola's reign. He fights alongside Arulmozhivarman against Mahindan's troops in Sri Lanka. He had a desire for Vaanathi to marry Arulmozhivarman and thus become the Queen. He and Thirukovalur Malaiyaman opposed the proposition of making Mathuranthakar the heir to the throne. The Kodumbalur Velars and Pazhuvettaraiyars were rivals though they were both loyal to the Cholas.
 Theveraalan (alias Parameswaran), Idumbankkari, Ravidasan, Soman Sambavan, Revadasa Kiramavithan: Antagonists of the novel. Bodyguards of the late Veerapandiyan. They conspire to kill the members of the Chola royal family. Ravidasan and Parameswaran were once ministers in Chola court. Ravidasan and Revadasa Kiramavithan were acting as wizards. Idumbankkari was acting as a guard in Kadambur palace.
 Amarabhujanga Nedunchezhiyan/ former Madhurantakan: Foster Son of Sembiyan Maadevi who was raised as a Shaivite. He was raised a calm and humble Shaivite and taught not to desire the throne. He was brainwashed by his twin sister Nandini to develop a greed for the throne. Kundavai and others thought that he was untalented and lacked the basic characteristics and skills to be an emperor. The people of the Chola kingdom did not want him to become the ruler either. He fled once he discovered he was the son of Veera Pandiyan and the crown prince of Pandya Kingdom, turning into a warrior.
 Mandakini Devi aka Singala Naachiyaar aka Oomai Rani ("The Mute Queen"): The deaf and mute mother of twins, Nandini and Amarabhujangan. Love interest of Sundara Chola. She had great affection towards his children and her niece, Poonguzhali. She is always around Arulmozhivarman and saves him from many dangers. [Mandakini Devi went to Thanjavur (while she was pregnant), Sembiyan Maadevi was pregnant too, so she took care of Mandakini during her pregnancy. During child birth Sembiyan Maadevi gave birth to a still born son but Mandakini gave birth twins to a boy (Madhurantaka) and a girl (Nandhini). Sembiyan Maadevi swapped her still born son with Mandakini's son. She asked Vaani Ammal (she was a maid in the place at that time) to bury her still born son and gave the daughter to Azhvarkadiyan's parents. Vaani Ammal after leaving the palace notices that Sembiyan Maadevi's son (Senthan Amuthan) is alive, she fosters him and raises him as her own son.]
 Sambuvaraiyar: The petty ruler of Kadamboor from the Sambuvaraya family.
 Chinna Sambuvaraiyar alias Kandhanmaran: Prince of Kadamboor. Son of Sambuvaraiyar and close friend of Vandiyathevan. He is the one who arranges for the petty rulers to gather in Kadamboor and hold a meeting to conspire to make Madhurantakan the next Chola emperor. He then assumes that Vandiyathevan tried to kill him and begins to think of him as his worst enemy.
 Murugaiyan: Elder brother of Poonguzhali. Husband of Rakkammaal. He rowed the Pandiyan conspirators to Sri Lanka from Kodikkarai. But later compensated his unknowing wrongdoing by helping Arulmozhivarman reach Thanjavur.
 Manimekalai: Innocent and shy princess of Kadamboor. Younger sister of Kandanmaaran and daughter of Sambuvaraiyar. She had deep, immense love for Vandiyathevan that he did not reciprocate.
 Karuthiruman aka Paithiyakaran (The Madman): An assistant of Veerapandian and prisoner in the dungeons of Thanjavur. Claims to know the location of the Pandyan crown and scepter hidden in Sri Lanka.
 Kudanthai Jothidar: The astrologer in the town of Kudanthai (present day Kumbakonam) who predicts that Arulmozhivarman will become a great emperor. He also predicts that Vanathi will marry Arulmozhi and bear a great king who will take the Chola dynasty to its glory. He later moves to Thiruvaiyaru since his house was destroyed in the Kaveri floods.
 Kalyani: Mother of Sundara Chola. Wife of Arinjaya Chola.
 Parangusan Nedunchezhiyan: Pandian Prince. The 5 year old son of Veerapandiyan and his Queen, raised by Nandini and the Aabathudhavigal (Pandyan conspirators) whom declared him the successor of Veerapandiyan at Thirupurambiyam Pallipadai.
 Eesaana Sivabattar: The priest of the Shiva temple in Pazhayarai. Elder brother of Azhwarkadiyan and foster brother of Nandini. He helps Vandiyathevan secretly meet Kundavai in Pazhayarai when the Pazhuvettaraiyar brothers were searching for him there.
 Aacharya Bhikshu: The head monk of Chudamani Vihara in Nagapattinam who saves Arulmozhivarman when he was affected by Kulir Suram.
 Chandramathi: Maid and companion of Manimekalai in Kadambur palace who is literate and helps her read the final letter written by Aditha Karikalan.
Veera Pandian: Pandian King. Father of Nandhini, Amarbhujangan and Parangusan. Husband of Mandakini. Killed by Aditha Karikalan when he was hiding in Nandhini's hut.

Plot summary 
The story revolves around Vandiyathevan, a charming, brave and courageous young man who sets out across the Chola land to deliver a message from the Crown Prince, Aditya Karikalan, to the Emperor Sundara Chola and the Princess Kundavai. The story shuttles between Vandiyathevan's travels in Chola country and the young Prince Arulmozhivarman's (later known as Raja Raja Chola) travels in Sri Lanka. The narrative details attempts by his sister Kundavai to bring back Arulmozhivarman to establish political peace in a land seemingly beset with unrest and civil war plotted by vassals and petty chieftains.

Parantaka Chola was succeeded by his second son Gandaraditya as the eldest son Rajaditya had died in a battle. At the time of Gandaraditya's death, his son Maduranthaka was a two-year-old child and hence Gandaraditya's brother Arinjaya ascended the throne. After Arinjaya's death, his son Parantaka II (Sundara Chola) was crowned. He had two sons, Aditya Karikalan, Arulmozhivarman, and a daughter named Kundavai.

The story begins as the emperor Sundara Chola is ill and bedridden. His son Aditya Karikalan is the general of the Northern Command and lives in Kanchi. The younger son Arulmozhivarman is in Sri Lanka on a military campaign. Their sister Kundavai lives in the Chola royal household at Pazhayarai.

The story advances when rumors abound that there is a conspiracy against Sundara Chola and his sons. Vallavarayan Vandiyathevan confirms these suspicions by eavesdropping on a secret meeting at the Kadamboor palace of his friend Kandhanmaaran.

In his youth, Aditya Karikalan had fallen in love with Nandhini, but she turned vengeful and vowed to destroy the Chola dynasty after Aditya Karikalan killed Veerapandiyan. We also meet Kundavai Piratti,
who after hearing the news of the conspiracy sends Vandiyathevan to Sri Lanka to give a message to Arulmozhivarman to come back immediately.

Besides these, there are other characters like Maduranthaka Thevar (the man whom the conspirators want to crown king), the son of Gandaraditya, and Aniruddha Brahmarayar, Sundara Cholar's Prime Minister and the man who has eyes and ears everywhere. Vandiyathevan also meets Brahmarayar's spy Azhwarkadiyan Nambi, a man who roams the country challenging Shaivites to debates. He collects information for the Prime Minister and is always around Vandiyathevan, rescuing him from trouble.

Other characters include Vaanathi, a Kodumbalur princess (the woman who later becomes Arulmozhivarman's wife) who is in love with Arulmozhivarman; Poonguzhali, the boat woman who rows the future king to Lanka; Mandakini, the deaf and mute birth mother of Maduranthaka Chola and the aunt of Poonguzhali. Most memorable among the female characters is Nandhini, whose beauty is said to have the power to influence any man. Manimegalai, the sister of Kandhanmaaran (the Kadamboor prince) who helps Nandhini without any knowledge that she is the conspirator and who also turns against Vandhiyathevan, his best friend.

Meanwhile, with Poonguzhali's help, Vandiyathevan reaches Sri Lanka, meets Arulmozhivarman, and becomes his close friend. In Sri Lanka, Arulmozhivarman realizes that his father had spent some time on a nearby island and had been with a girl who was born deaf and mute. He meets her and realizes from her drawing that she and his father have had two children. Who are those children and do they have the right to the throne? Later one day in Thirupurambayam forest Vandiyathevan sees Nandhini and the Pandya conspirators place a small boy on a throne and take a vow in front of him. Who is this boy and what right does he have to the throne?

While coming back from Sri Lanka, Arulmozhivarman is caught in a cyclone and goes missing. Rumor spreads that he is dead, but he survives and recuperates at Choodamani Viharam, a Buddhist monastery in. Then slowly the dispersed family starts assembling. The conspirators meanwhile choose a day in which both the emperor and both of his sons will be assassinated.

Nandhini in the meantime calls Aditya Karikalan to Kadamboor Palace to discuss the future of the kingdom. Though Karikalan knows that his life is in utter danger, he travels to Kadamboor to meet with Nandhini. Aditya Karikalan is then assassinated at the palace.

Meanwhile, Arulmozhivarman recovers and returns to Thanjavur, where he was initially forced to accept the crown. He appears to acquiesce, but later tricks everyone during the coronation ceremony and crowns his uncle Uthama Chola instead. Thus the fifth part of the book is named as Thiyaaga Sigaram, the pinnacle of sacrifice.

Publication 
The novel was first serialised in the weekly editions of Kalki during the period from 29 October 1950 to 16 May 1954 resulting the total period of development of work be 3 years, 6 months, and 18 days. The following year, Managala Noolagam released the novel in book form.

Adaptations

Film and television 
There have been several attempts to create film adaptations of Ponniyin Selvan, beginning with an attempt in 1958 by M. G. Ramachandran. Ramachandran chosen Mahendran to write screenplay for the film. Before shooting could begin, Ramachandran met with an accident, and the wound took six months to heal, Ramachandran was unable to continue with the film despite renewing the rights four years later.

In the late 1980s, actor Kamal Haasan and Mani Ratnam worked together on adopting the novel into a film. Ratnam revealed that he worked on a first draft of the film alongside Kamal Haasan, who had bought the rights of the novel from Ramachandran, but the pair shelved their plan as the project did not make financial sense at the time. Ramachandran also requested Bharathiraja to make the film. Kamal Haasan then attempted to make the story into a forty-part television series during the early 1990s, and worked with writer Ra. Ki. Rangarajan on the screenplay, but the project was later stalled.

In the 2000s, there were further attempts to make the book into television series by Makkal TV and by Kalaignar TV, through a project directed by Naga. A 32-hour animation film was planned by Rewinda Movie Toons, a Chennai-based animation studio, in 2008 and took seven years to complete. The film was set to be released by April 2015, but remains unreleased as of October 2022. In late 2010, Ratnam renewed his interest in his film project and worked alongside writer Jeyamohan to finalise the script for the film adaptation of Ponniyin Selvan. The film was later shelved before the start of the filming stage, as the expected cost of production escalated. Jeyamohan stated that the film did not materialise as the team struggled to find available locations to shoot the film. He revealed that temple officials in Tamil Nadu refused to allow the team to film scenes on the premises and that the expensive cost of producing replica sets meant that it would not be a viable solution.

In 2016, Eros International engaged Jeyamohan and Soundarya Rajinikanth, as a creative producer, to make the book into a web-series but the project did not develop into production. In early 2019, Soundarya Rajinikanth associated with another production house, May 6 Entertainment, and director Sooriyaprathap to make a web-series of the novel for MX Player. After years of little promotion, Soundarya announced that the project was still under the planning phase during September 2021. In January 2021, a further adapted web series produced by Eternitee Motion Krafte and directed by Ajay Pratheeb titled Chiranjeevi Ponniyin Selvan was announced. The makers announced that the series would have 125 episodes, with technicians such as Ilaiyaraaja and Sabu Cyril joining the team.

2022 film 

In early 2019, Mani Ratnam officially restarted production on his film project. His two-film adaptation featured an ensemble cast consisting of Vikram, Aishwarya Rai Bachchan, Jayam Ravi, Karthi and Trisha. In September 2021, the filming for both the parts got completed. The film was released on 30 September 2022 in five Indian languages.

Stage play 
Avvai Shanmugam was the first to organise a conference on Tamil drama in Erode, and the first to organise a drama contest, in 1945.
One of the prize winning scripts was 'Raja Raja Chozhan,’ which was staged in 1955 with Shanmugam as prince Rajendra.
'Raja Raja Chozhan' was also presented at the Motilal Nehru Centenary celebrations in Delhi in 1961, earning compliments from Nehru for the splendid acting.
In Singapore, 'Raja Raja Chozhan' was also enacted 90 times. Overall it was staged 2,146 times.

Avvai Shanmugam played the role of Maamallan in Kalki's 'Sivakamiyin Sabatham' and the sets were grand, befitting the story. For the scene in which Paranjothi tames an elephant that runs amok, two men inside a specially made elephant, operated levers as they walked in unison.

In 1999 the book was adapted into a stage play by E. Kumaravel and was staged by Magic Lantern Theater in Buck's Theatre inside YMCA Nandanam, Chennai. The script's length was originally over nine hours long, but was shortened into a performance time of four hours and 20 minutes and featured 72 actors on a multi-level setting.

Again, the book was adapted into a stage play in a very grand scale by SS International Live along with Magic Lantern theatre group in Chennai, in June 2014. The crew includes Kumaravel, who penned the screenplay & dialogues, Thotta Tharani as art director, Preethi Athreya as costume designer and Bhanu leading the make-up and hair styling department. Pravin directed the play.

Chicago Tamil Sangam staged the play in May 2013 with over 40 volunteers in cast and crew.

Novels and Comic books 
The Tiger Throne by Preetha Rajah Kannan is a retelling of this novel.

In 2017, Nila comics started releasing series of comic books where every comic book is an adaptation of two chapters from the novel. It is available in Tamil and English. As of January 2019, There have been 18 comic books released in Tamil and 10 in English.

English and other translations 
There are at least five different translations of Ponniyin Selvan available in English by Indra Neelamegam, Pavithra Srinivasan, CV Karthik Narayanan, Varalotti Rengasamy and Sumeetha Manikandan. On 21 February 2015, a Sanskrit translation by Rajalakshmi Srinivasan was released at a public function in Chennai.

English translations

Malayalam translations

See also 

Sivagamiyin Sapatham
Parthiban Kanavu

References

Bibliography

External links 

 Ponniyin Selvan Tamil Audio Book by Nandhini – Nandhiniyin Kural
கல்கியின் பொன்னியின் செல்வன் 2D வடிவில் - Ponniyin Selvan Tamil Book Narrated by Satheeshraj (Bioscope) – 150 Episodes
Kalki's பொன்னியின்_செல்வன் தமிழ் ஒலிப் புத்தகம் (Ponniyin Selvan Tamil Audio Book Narrated by Sri Srinivasa (Spotify) – 77 hours (all 5 Bagams/ Parts) Story in Tamil
Ponniyin Selvan Audio & Video Story in Tamil
Ponniyin Selvan Audio Books / Ponniyin Selvan Story in Tamil by Music Box Tamil – Ponniyin Selvan Full Story details Audio Book.
 Ponniyin Selvan – Complete Novel in Tamil Wikisource (Unicode)
 Ponniyin Selvan in Google Books
 Ponniyin Selvan Varalaatru Peravai – Discussed extensively about Ponniyin Selvan novel, characters, facts and fiction. Also discuss other history related topics related to India.
 Ponniyin Selvan with Original Maniam Pictures – Ponniyin Selvan published with Original Pictures of Artist Maniam by Vikatan.
Kalki's Novel as Tamil Audio Books by Sri Srinivasa – details on Kalki's novel Ponniyin Selvan, Sivagamiyn Sabatham, Parthiban Kanavu in Audio Book Mp3 format
 Ponniyin Selvan Novel epub Free work – details on Kalki's novel Ponniyin Selvan, Sivagamiyn Sabatham, Parthiban Kanavu in Epub and Kindle format
Balasubramanian, Kudavoil. "Udaiyarkugi Inscription", Varalaaru
Indra Neelameggham, English translation, free link Ponni's Beloved
Indra Neelameggham, English translation, part 3B 

Tamil history
Tamil novels
Novels first published in serial form
Indian romance novels
Historical romance novels
Works originally published in Kalki (magazine)
Novels set in the Chola Empire
Indian historical novels
Indian historical novels in Tamil
Novels set in Tamil Nadu
Indian novels adapted into films